Foxx is a surname.

People with the surname
Notable people with the surname include:

 Foxx (rapper) (born 1984), American rapper
 Anthony Foxx (born 1971), American politician
 Dion Foxx (born 1971), American football player
 Inez and Charlie Foxx (1939–1998), American rhythm and blues duo
 Jamie Foxx (born 1967), American actor, singer and comedian; stage name chosen in homage to actor and comedian Redd Foxx.
 Jimmie Foxx (1907–1967), American major league baseball player
 John Foxx (born 1948), English musician
 Kevin Foxx (born 1970), Canadian comedian and radio host
 Kim Foxx (born 1972), State's Attorney for Cook County, Illinois
 Martha Louise Morrow Foxx (1902–1975), American educator from Mississippi
 Redd Foxx (1922–1991), American actor and comedian; stage name chosen (in part) in homage to baseball player Jimmie Foxx.
 Virginia Foxx (born 1943), American politician from North Carolina

Fictional characters 
 Mystique (comics), a Marvel Comics character who once used the alias Foxx
 Steve and Rod Foxx, a pair of brothers from the Australian television series Double the Fist
 Zachary Foxx, a character from The Adventures of the Galaxy Rangers
Goldie Foxx, keyboardist of the virtual band Studio Killers

See also
 Fox (disambiguation)
 Fox (surname)